Sybra flavostriata is a species of beetle in the family Cerambycidae. It was described by Hayashi in 1968.

References

flavostriata
Beetles described in 1968